Gary Keith Ackers (1939 - 2011) was Emeritus Professor of Biochemistry and Molecular Biophysics of Washington University in St. Louis, Missouri.

His research focused on thermodynamic linkage analysis of biological macromolecules, addressing the molecular mechanism of cooperative O2 binding to human hemoglobin since the early 1970s. He was a Fellow of the Biophysical Society and one of the founders of the annual Gibbs Conference.

Professor Ackers invented agarose gel chromatography when he was a teenager. He went on the develop analytical gel chromatography methods for determinations of many important characteristics of water-soluble proteins; diffusion coefficient, molecular size,
 

thermodynamics of protein-protein interactions including important changes due to single amino acid substitutions.

References

1939 births
2011 deaths
Washington University in St. Louis faculty
American biochemists
Scientists from Missouri